Ocean Prime is a steakhouse and seafood restaurant concept owned by Cameron Mitchell Restaurants that currently consists of nine restaurants in eight states. Ocean Prime opened in Troy, Michigan in June 2008 and has locations in Columbus, Ohio (under the name Mitchell's Ocean Club), Orlando, Phoenix, Tampa, Dallas, Denver and Atlanta. Other Ocean Prime locations are set to open in Indianapolis (June 7, 2012) and Houston (2014).

Restaurants

Mitchell's Ocean Club
 Easton Town Center, Columbus, Ohio August 2006

Ocean Prime

 Beverly Hills, California
 Boston
 Chicago
 Dallas
 Denver - Larimer Square
 Denver - Tech Center
 Detroit
 Indianapolis
 Kansas City
 Naples, Florida
 New York City
 Orlando, Florida
 Philadelphia
 Phoenix, Arizona
 Tampa, Florida
 Washington, DC

Awards
 Best Place to Impress a Date, Jezebel, 2012
 Best Seafood, Business A-List, Ambassador Magazine, 2012
 Best Seafood, Editor's Pick, 5280 Magazine, 2011
 Best Piano Bar & Outdoor Space, Tampa Bay Metro, 2011
 Golden Brand, Florida Trend's Golden Spoon Awards, 2011-12
 2011 Cheers Beverage Excellence Award, Best Spirits Program
 Best Dessert (Ten Layer Carrot Cake), D Magazine, 2010
 Best Piano Bar, Tampa Bay Metro Best Awards, 2010
 Readers' Choice Restaurant Awards - Best Seafood, North Valley Magazine, 2010
 Readers' Choice Restaurant Awards - Most Romantic, North Valley Magazine, 2009
 Best of Troy, Michigan, Troy Chamber of Commerce, 2008

See also
 List of seafood restaurants

References

2008 establishments in Michigan
Restaurant chains in the United States
Seafood restaurants in the United States
Restaurants established in 2008
Companies based in Troy, Michigan